Clifford V. Anderson (September 7, 1944 – July 26, 2021) was an American professional basketball player. He played collegiately for Saint Joseph's University.

He was selected by the Los Angeles Lakers in the 4th round (35th pick overall) of the 1967 NBA draft.

He played for the Lakers (1967–69), Cleveland Cavaliers and Philadelphia 76ers (1970–71) in the NBA and for the Denver Rockets (1969–70) in the ABA for 84 games.

Anderson died on July 26, 2021.

References

1944 births
2021 deaths
All-American college men's basketball players
American men's basketball players
Basketball players from Philadelphia
Cleveland Cavaliers players
Denver Rockets players
Harlem Globetrotters players
Los Angeles Lakers draft picks
Los Angeles Lakers players
Philadelphia 76ers players
Saint Joseph's Hawks men's basketball players
Shooting guards
Wilmington Blue Bombers players